Anita Silsby is an American taekwondo practitioner.

She won a gold medal in welterweight at the 1989 World Taekwondo Championships in Seoul, by defeating Ayse Alkaya in the semifinal, and Anne-Mieke Buijs in the final.

References

External links

Year of birth missing (living people)
Living people
American female taekwondo practitioners
World Taekwondo Championships medalists
21st-century American women